Cambridgeshire was a constituency of the European Parliament located in the United Kingdom, electing one Member of the European Parliament by the first-past-the-post electoral system. It was first created in 1979 for the first elections to the European Parliament, but was abolished in 1984 election.

It was re-created in 1994 and abolished in 1999 on the adoption of proportional representation for European elections in the United Kingdom. It was succeeded by the East of England region.

Boundaries

1979—1984 
On its creation in 1979, it consisted of the parliamentary constituencies of Cambridge, Cambridgeshire, Huntingdonshire, Isle of Ely, Peterborough, and Wellingborough.

When it was abolished in 1984, the subsequent seats were based on the parliamentary constituencies created by the 1983 boundary changes. The area covered by the new parliamentary constituencies of Cambridge, Huntingdon, North East Cambridgeshire, Peterborough and South West Cambridgeshire became part of the Cambridge and Bedfordshire North constituency, while Wellingborough was transferred to Northamptonshire and South East Cambridgeshire was transferred to Suffolk.

1994—1999

The Cambridgeshire constituency was re-created in 1994 from parts of Cambridge and Bedfordshire North and Suffolk. The re-established constituency consisted of the Westminster parliamentary constituencies of Cambridge, Huntingdon, North East Cambridgeshire, Peterborough, South East Cambridgeshire and South West Cambridgeshire. Cambridge, Huntingdon, North East Cambridgeshire, Peterborough and South West Cambridgeshire had previously been part of the Cambridge and Bedfordshire North constituency, while South East Cambridgeshire had been part of the Suffolk constituency.

MEPs

Election results

References

External links
 David Boothroyd's United Kingdom Election Results 

European Parliament constituencies in England (1979–1999)
Politics of Cambridgeshire
1979 establishments in England
1984 disestablishments in England
Constituencies established in 1979
Constituencies disestablished in 1984